Perth Amboy Public Schools is a community public school district serving students in pre-kindergarten through twelfth grade, located in the city of Perth Amboy, in Middlesex County, New Jersey, United States. The district is one of 31 former Abbott districts statewide that were established pursuant to the decision by the New Jersey Supreme Court in Abbott v. Burke which are now referred to as "SDA Districts" based on the requirement for the state to cover all costs for school building and renovation projects in these districts under the supervision of the New Jersey Schools Development Authority.

As of the 2020–21 school year, the district, comprised of 12 schools, had an enrollment of 10,786 students and 898.7 classroom teachers (on an FTE basis), for a student–teacher ratio of 12.0:1.

The district is classified by the New Jersey Department of Education as being in District Factor Group "A", the lowest of eight groupings. District Factor Groups organize districts statewide to allow comparison by common socioeconomic characteristics of the local districts. From lowest socioeconomic status to highest, the categories are A, B, CD, DE, FG, GH, I and J.

Schools 

Schools in the district (with 2020–21 enrollment data from the National Center for Education Statistics) are:

Early childhood schools
 Ignacio Cruz Early Childhood Center (667 students; in (PreK)
Susan Roque, Principal
 Edmund Hmieleski Jr. Early Childhood Center (362; PreK)
Dr. Jeri Mast, Principal
 School #7 Early Childhood Center (NA; PreK)
Susan Roque, Principal

Elementary schools
 Anthony V. Ceres Elementary School (581; K-4)
Derrick Kyriacou, Principal 
 James J. Flynn Elementary School (550; K-4)
Dr. Regina Postogna, Principal
 Rose M. Lopez Elementary School (812; K-3)
Edwin Nieves, Principal
 Edward J. Patten Elementary Elementary School (660; K-4)
Lauren Marrocco, Principal
 Dr. Herbert N. Richardson 21st Century Elementary School (491; K-4)
Ronald Mascenik, Principal
 Robert N. Wilentz Elementary School (637; K-4)
Robyn Carrera, Principal

Middle schools
 Dual Language School (397; 4-8)
Jose Santos, Principal
 William C. McGinnis Middle School (1,398; 5-8)
David Loniewski Jr., Principal
 Samuel E. Shull Middle School (1,410; 5-8)
Jennifer Joseph, Principal
         
High school
 Perth Amboy High School (2,547; 9-12)
Michael Heidelberg, Principal
Freshman Academy
Keith Guarino, Principal
   
Adult school
 Adult Education Center
Fred Geardino, Principal/Director

Central administration 
Core members of the district's administration are:
Dr. David A. Roman, Superintendent of Schools
Michael LoBrace, Acting Business Administrator/Board Secretary

Board of education
The district's board of education, comprised of nine members, sets policy and oversees the fiscal and educational operation of the district through its administration. As a Type II school district, the board's trustees are elected directly by voters to serve three-year terms of office on a staggered basis, with three seats up for election each year held (since 2013) as part of the November general election. The board appoints a superintendent to oversee the district's day-to-day operations and a business administrator to supervise the business functions of the district.

References

External links
Perth Amboy Public Schools
 
School Data for the Perth Amboy Public Schools, National Center for Education Statistics

Perth Amboy, New Jersey
New Jersey Abbott Districts
New Jersey District Factor Group A
School districts in Middlesex County, New Jersey